The Bahamas national cricket team is the team that represents The Bahamas in international cricket. The team is organised by the Bahamas Cricket Association (BCA), which became an affiliate member of the International Cricket Council (ICC) in 1987 and an associate member in 2017. The national team is first recorded as playing in 1983, but did not feature in an international tournament until 2001, when it played in the inaugural Americas Affiliates Championship. Since then, the Bahamas have regularly participated in ICC Americas tournaments, as well as on one occasion in a World Cricket League event (the 2010 Division Eight tournament). The team was also invited to the 2006 and 2008 Stanford 20/20 tournaments, where matches had full Twenty20 status.

In April 2018, the ICC decided to grant full Twenty20 International (T20I) status to all its members. Therefore, all Twenty20 matches played between the Bahamas and other ICC members after 1 January 2019 will be a full T20I.

History

The Bahamas became an affiliate member of the ICC in 1987, although they didn't appear in international competition until the ICC Americas Championship in 2002. They came fifth in that tournament, gaining a surprise win over hosts Argentina. They again played in the tournament in 2004, this time coming through a qualifying tournament. They finished last in the main tournament though, which meant they played in Division Two of the new divisional system in 2006. They finished second in that tournament, which wasn't good enough to qualify for Division One. They will remain in Division two in 2008.

In 2006, The Bahamas were one of the teams invited to take part in the Stanford 20/20. They got $100,000 for participating in the tournament, but were eliminated at the first hurdle by the Cayman Islands.

Bahamas played in the 2021 ICC Men's T20 World Cup Americas Qualifier, its first official ICC tournament in twelve years. Andy Moles was appointed as the team's head coach for the tournament. The Cricketer reported that the team went "without an international fixture for a staggering eight and a half years due to a combination of lack of funding and ICC cutbacks on tournaments at this level of associate cricket".

Tournament history

World Cup

1975 to 1987: Not eligible, not an ICC member
1992 to 2003: Not eligible, ICC affiliate member
2007: Did not qualify

World Cricket League
 2008: Division Five Eleventh place

ICC Trophy

1979 to 1986: Not eligible, not an ICC member
1990 to 2001: Not eligible, ICC affiliate member
2005: Did not qualify

ICC Americas Championship

2000: Did not participate
2002: 5th place
2004: 6th place
2006: Division Two runners up
2008: Division Two runners up
2010: Division Two champions
2010: Division One 6th place

Records 
International Match Summary — Bahamas
 
Last updated 4 March 2023

Twenty20 International 

T20I record versus other nations

Records complete to T20I #2012. Last updated 4 March 2023.

Players
Players for Bahamian cricket team in Bermuda in 2019. 

 Gregory Taylor (c)
 Whitcliff Atkinson
 Jonathan Barry
 Marcus Bowe
 Rudolph Fox
 Dereck Gittens
 Gregory Irvin
 Mark Levy
 Albert Peters
 Junior Scott
 Orlando Stuart
 Ryan Tappin
 Marc Taylor

See also
List of Bahamas Twenty20 International cricketers

References

Cricket in the Bahamas
National cricket teams
Cricket
Bahamas in international cricket